Arahatti is a village in Dharwad district of Karnataka, India.

Demographics 
As of the 2011 Census of India there were 149 households in Arahatti and a total population of 868 consisting of 456 males and 412 females. There were 103 children ages 0-6.

References

Villages in Dharwad district